Cedrick Wilson may refer to:
 Cedrick Wilson Sr., American football player in the NFL from 2001 to 2007
 Cedrick Wilson Jr., son of Cedrick Wilson Sr. and American football player drafted in the NFL in 2018
 Cedric Wilson, politician in Northern Ireland
 C. W. M. Wilson (Cedric Wilson, 1923–1993), British pharmacologist and medical historian